Fabian Klos (born 2 December 1987) is a German professional footballer who plays as a forward for 2. Bundesliga club Arminia Bielefeld. He is the captain of the team.

Career
Born in Gifhorn, Klos was a prolific goalscorer in amateur football in Lower Saxony.

In 2009, he joined VfL Wolfsburg II spending two years in the Regionalliga Nord.

In 2011, he signed for Arminia Bielefeld of the 3. Liga alongside team-mate Maximilian Ahlschwede, and made his debut on the opening day of the 2011–12 season, as a substitute for Johannes Rahn in a 2–1 defeat against VfB Stuttgart II. He scored ten goals in his first season with Bielefeld, and was named as 3. Liga player of the year. He scored 20 goals in the 2012–13 season, finishing as joint top-scorer of the 3. Liga, along with Chemnitzer FC's Anton Fink, as Bielefeld were promoted to the 2. Bundesliga as runners-up. 

In October 2013, he suffered a concussion during a match, but returned to the pitch after one and half month. After the season his team got relegated to the 3. Liga again. In spite of offers from some 2. Bundesliga sides, Klos stayed with Arminia. He became the team's captain and - for the second time - the league's top-scorer. Arminia returned to the 2. Bundesliga, where they would stay for five seasons.

After Jeff Saibene had become Arminia's manager, Klos started many games on the bench. Dynamo Dresden was already interested in him after the 2016-17 season, but he decided to improve his fitness and to fight to become a part of the starting XI again. Nevertheless, Julian Börner was elected captain for the 2017-18 season.

In April 2018 he becomes Arminia Bielefeld's all-time top-scorer. In 2019, he became the team's captain again. Furthermore, he was the league's top-scorer in the 2019-20 season, scoring 21 goals. Thus, Arminia got promoted to the Bundesliga.

He scored his first goal on 28 November at RB Leipzig away. In fact, he played every match in the 2020–21 season. In February 2022, the club and him had already agreed to let his contract expire after the 2021–22 season. But in April, he suffered a serious head injury and had to end the season. Thus - and perhaps because the relegation to the 2. Bundesliga was already foreseeable - he decided to stay.

In the 2022-23 he is still a regular player.

Career statistics

References

External links
 

Living people
1987 births
People from Gifhorn
Footballers from Lower Saxony
German footballers
Association football forwards
VfL Wolfsburg II players
Arminia Bielefeld players
Bundesliga players
2. Bundesliga players
3. Liga players
Regionalliga players